The Northern Region Football (NRF) is an association football organisation, responsible for local growth and development of the game from Northland to South Auckland, New Zealand. 

Previously the Northern Football Federation ran football from Northland down to the North Shore and West Auckland, while the Auckland Football Federation covered the rest of the Auckland region.

In 2019, a joint meeting was held to consider a joint operating model in 2020. Northern Region Football was formed in 2020 and Laura Menzies was appointed at the new organisations first Chief Executive Officer.

Staff
Staff contacts:
Laura Menzies – Chief Executive Officer
Steven Upfold – General Manager of Football 
Colin Margison – Chief Financial Officer
Mark Casson – Marketing & Communications Manager - Talent
TBC – Marketing & Communications Manager - Community

Member clubs
Club directory:

References

Association football organizations
Association football in New Zealand
Association football in Auckland
Organisations based in New Zealand
Organizations established in 2020